José de Antequera y Castro (Panama, 1689—Peru, July 5, 1731) was a Panamanian lawyer and judge in the Viceroyalty of Peru (then including Panama, Bolivia and Paraguay), and the leader of an insurrection in Paraguay against the viceroy and the king.

Early career
Antequera y Castro was born in Panama. He was an oidor (judge) in the Audiencia of Panama before traveling to Spain. He became a knight of the Order of Alcántara. He was public prosecutor before the Audiencia of Charcas (Alto Peru, now Bolivia) in charge of protecting the Indians.

In Paraguay
He was sent from Charcas to Asunción, Paraguay in 1721 as an inspector and member of the Audiencia there. His instructions were to investigate charges made by the cabildo (city council) of Asunción against the governor of Paraguay, Diego de los Reyes Balmaseda. If the governor's guilt was established, Antequera was to remove him from office, occupy the office himself, and reestablish justice in the province. If, on the other hand, the governor was acquitted, Antequera was to wait until the expiration of his legal term in office, and then take over the government.

Reyes Balmaceda was removed as governor, and Antequera earned the sympathy of the Spanish settlers in Paraguay. After the removal of Reyes, the Criollos named Antequera to take his place. Antequera became acting governor in August 1721. Reyes Balmaseda was restored in February 1722, but before the year was out, Antequera was again governor. He retained the position until March 5, 1725.

The Jesuits, however, were supporters of the dismissed governor. They had been working actively to shelter the Indians from the forced-labor demands of the colonists, and were therefore resented by the colonists. Reyes Balmaseda had supported the Jesuits, and it was that connection that led to the colonists' call for his removal. After Antequera consolidated his power, he expelled the Jesuits.

He then defeated a royalist force from Buenos Aires under García Ros. Reyes Balmaseda had fled to Corrientes, and in a surprise raid there, Antequera took him prisoner. There were suspicions he intended to proclaim himself king, independent of Spain.

Defeat and capture
In 1724, José de Armendáriz, now the viceroy in Lima, ordered Buenos Aires governor Bruno Mauricio de Zabala to suppress the rebellion and send Antequera to Lima for trial. Zabala led an army which included 6,000 Indians from the Jesuit missions against Antequera. On instructions from King Philip V, Armendáriz ordered the Jesuits readmitted. (After some delay, they reoccupied their college in Asunción on March 18, 1728).

In the face of the army raised against them, Antequera's followers deserted him. In March 1725 he was forced to flee to a Franciscan convent in Córdoba, and from there he later fled to Charcas. He was arrested at Chuquisaca in Charcas, and taken to Lima. He received the liberty of the city for four years while his case was being heard. On September 4, 1728, Antequera sent a report to the Audiencia of Charcas, defending his actions in Paraguay. Finally, in 1731, orders came from Madrid to execute him.

Execution
When he was brought to the Plaza de Armas, where he was to be beheaded, the crowd assembled there demanded his pardon and threw stones at his escort. Viceroy Armendáriz, who was in attendance, rode among the crowd to try to quiet them, but he too was pelted with stones. Fearing that Antequera would escape, Armendáriz ordered the soldiers to shoot him, which they did. They then turned their guns on the crowd. Several priests were killed. Antequera's corpse was then taken from his place of death to the scaffold and beheaded. The head was displayed publicly.

In 1778, King Charles III of Spain annulled the verdict against Antequera, declaring him a good and loyal minister.

Aftermath
Another revolt broke out in Paraguay in 1730, under Doctor Fernando Mompox y Zayas (Mompox and Antequera had met in prison in Lima). Mompox asserted the sovereignty of the people over the king and attracted many formerly powerless poor colonists to the cause. These interrelated rebellions are known as the Revolt of the Comuneros, one of the first revolts of American colonists against European colonial rule.

External links
A Vanished Arcadia by R. B. Cunninghame Graham
 Antequera and Reyes Balmaceda (Archived 2009-10-31)
 His 1728 report to the Audiencia of Charcas
Dates of his administration
The situation in Paraguay
His execution

Panamanian judges
1689 births
1731 deaths
Colonial Peru
Governors of Paraguay